is a 1976 Japanese historical television series. It is the 14th NHK taiga drama. Kaze to kumo to Niji to deals with the Heian period in Japan. Based on Chōgorō Kaionji's novels Taira no Masakado and Umi to Kaze to Niji to. The drama was made with Go Kato's request.

Plot
The story chronicles the life of Taira no Masakado.

The story begins with Masakado's childhood. Masakado happens to meet Fujiwara no Hidesato, and he thinks that he want to be great Samurai like Hidesato in the future.

Production

Original – Chōgorō Kaionji
Music – Naozumi Yamamoto

Cast
Starring role
Go Kato as Taira no Masakado

Masakado's family
Keiju Kobayashi as Taira no Yoshimasa, the father of Masakado
Michiyo Aratama as Masako, the mother of Masakado
Kenji Takaoka as Taira no Masayori, Masakado's younger brother
Masakado's retainers
Masao Kusakari as Genmei
Joe Shishido as Gendō
Masakane Yonekura as Okiyo-ō
Toyoshi Fukuda as Iwa no Kazutsune
Masako Mori as Kikyo
Yousuke Kondō  as Miyake Kiyotada
Kunika family
Takashi Yamaguchi  as Taira no Sadamori, Masakado's rival
Asao Sano as Taira no Kunika
Yatsuko Tan'ami as Hideko
Tsuyoshi Sasaki as Taira no Morishige
Yoshikane family
Isamu Nagato as Taira no Yoshikane
Yuriko Hoshi as Senko
Yoshikane's family
Isamu Nagato as Tairo no Yoshikane
Yuriko Hoshi as Senko

Minamoto (Genji)
Kō Nishimura as Minamoto no Mamoru
Tōru Minegishi as Minamoto no Tasuku

People of Kantō
Shigeru Tsuyuguchi as Fujiwara no Hidesato
Kunishirō Hayashi, Hidesato's subordinate
Seiji Miyaguchi as Musashi no Takeshiba
People of Kyoto
Sayuri Yoshinaga as Takako, Masakado's lover

Others
Keizō Kanie as Taira no Yoshimasa
Fumio Watanabe as Taira no Yoshifumi
Kiwako Taichi as Musashi
Asao Koike as Ono no Michikaze
Kazuko Yoshiyuki as Kera
Minori Terada as Fujiwara no Masatsune
Ken Ogata as Fujiwara no Sumitomo

References

External links
NHK Kaze to Kumo to Niji to official cite

Taiga drama
1976 Japanese television series debuts
1976 Japanese television series endings
1970s drama television series
Jidaigeki television series
Television series set in the 10th century
Television shows based on Japanese novels